The International Harvester Company Warehouse is a building in southeast Portland, Oregon listed on the National Register of Historic Places.

See also
 National Register of Historic Places listings in Southeast Portland, Oregon

References

Further reading 

1912 establishments in Oregon
Buckman, Portland, Oregon
Industrial buildings completed in 1912
Navistar International
Portland Eastside MPS
Warehouses on the National Register of Historic Places
Industrial buildings and structures on the National Register of Historic Places in Portland, Oregon
Portland Historic Landmarks